Christopher B. Quinn  (born October 11, 1967) is an American politician and former Republican member of the Pennsylvania House of Representatives, representing the 168th District from 2016 to 2023.

Quinn holds a B.A. in Economics from the University of South Florida, and started an insurance agency in Delaware County in 2002. Prior to being elected state representative, Quinn served as a Middletown Township Councilman and as Vice Treasurer of the Delaware County Industrial Development Authority.

Quinn was elected to the state House in a special election held on July 12, 2016. During his tenure, he sat on the Appropriations, Consumer Affairs, and Insurance committees. He lost the 2022 general election to Democrat Lisa Borowski of Radnor.

References

External links

Living people
Republican Party members of the Pennsylvania House of Representatives
21st-century American politicians
1967 births
People from Middletown Township, Delaware County, Pennsylvania